Final league standings for the 1989 Western Soccer League season.

League standings

North Division

South Division

Playoffs

Bracket

Semifinal 1

Semifinal 2

Final

Points leaders

Honors
 MVP: Kasey Keller
 Leading goal scorer: Steve Corpening
 Leading goalkeeper: Kasey Keller
First Team All League
Goalkeeper: Kasey Keller
Defenders: Marcelo Balboa, John Doyle, Mike Lapper, Cle Kooiman
Midfielders: Dominic Kinnear, John Bain, Chris Henderson
Forwards: Scott Benedetti, Jeff Hooker, Mark Kerlin

Second Team All League
Goalkeeper: Todd Elias
Defenders: Steve Boardman, Troy Dayak, Grant Gibbs, Arturo Velazco
Midfielders: Jim Gabarra, Jerome Watson
Forwards: Steve Corpening, Brent Goulet, Eddie Henderson, Wes Wade

1989 National Professional Soccer Championship
In anticipation of a proposed merger, which eventually took place the following year, the WSL champions faced off against the American Soccer League champions in the 1989 National Pro Soccer Championship on September 9 at Spartan Stadium in San Jose, California. The matched marked the first time since 1984 that an undisputed national champion of professional soccer was crowned in the U.S.

Match report

References

External links
 The Year in American Soccer - 1989
 1988 Western Soccer Alliance

Western Soccer Alliance seasons
2

nl:Amerikaans voetbalkampioenschap 1989